Events in the year 2020 in Peru.

Incumbents 
 President:
 Martín Vizcarra
 Francisco Sagasti (from 17 November)
 Prime Minister:
 Vicente Zeballos (until 15 July)
 Pedro Cateriano (from 15 July)
 Walter Martos Ruiz (from 6 August)
 Violeta Bermúdez (from 18 November)

Events 
Ongoing – The 2017–2021 Peruvian political crisis

January 
26 January – Scheduled date for the 2020 Peruvian parliamentary election.

April 
27 April – A prison riot at the Miguel Castro Castro prison in San Juan de Lurigancho, Lima left nine inmates dead.

August 
 22 August – 13 people are killed in a stampede when police raided at a nightclub in Los Olivos District.

September 
18 September – Impeachment hearings for President Martín Vizcarra begin.

Deaths

January 
 January 4 – Walter Ormeño, footballer (b. 1926).
 January 9 – Pablo Macera, historian (b. 1929).
 January 19 – Dante Frasnelli Tarter, Roman Catholic bishop (b. 1925).

March 
 March 4 – Javier Pérez de Cuéllar, politician and diplomat (b. 1920).

June 
 June 1 – Javier Alva Orlandini, politician, Vice President, President of the Senate (b. 1927).
 June 9 – Luis Repetto Málaga, museologist and cultural manager (b. 1953).

July 
 July 1 – Santiago Manuin Valera, Awajún leader and Indigenous rights activist (b. 1957).

August 
 August 10 – Luis Abilio Sebastiani Aguirre, Roman Catholic prelate, Archbishop of Ayacucho o Huamanga (b. 1935).
 August 12 – Gian Carlo Vacchelli, sports commentator and politician (b. 1981).
 August 14 – Moisés Mamani, politician (b. 1969).
 August 24 – Jorge Sanjinez Lenz, military volunteer (b. 1917).
 August 25 – Francisco Belaúnde, politician (b. 1923).

September 
 September 14 – Alicia Maguiña, singer and composer (b. 1938).

December 
 December 14 – Segundo Galicia Sánchez, professor and sociologist (b. 1938).

See also 

 History of Peru

References 

 
Peru
Peru
2020s in Peru
Years of the 21st century in Peru